Little Atherfield is a small settlement on the Isle of Wight. It is near the coast in the Back of the Wight. The Isle of Wight is situated off the south coast of England. According to the Post Office the 2011 Census population of the village was listed in the civil parish of Niton and Whitwell.

Villages on the Isle of Wight